UFC 19: Ultimate Young Guns was a mixed martial arts event held by the Ultimate Fighting Championship on March 5, 1999 at the Casino Magic in Bay St. Louis, Mississippi. The event was seen live on pay-per-view in the United States, and later released on home video.

History
UFC 19 featured the first appearance of collegiate wrestler Kevin Randleman, as well as the first televised appearance of former UFC Light Heavyweight Champion and Hall of Famer Chuck Liddell, who had fought at UFC 17 in an untelevised alternate bout. Future referee Dan Miragliotta made his UFC debut as a judge for the event.

In the main event, Guy Mezger fought Tito Ortiz. Ortiz won the fight via TKO. The bout was a rematch of their first fight in the finals of UFC 13, which Mezger won via guillotine choke submission. Ortiz was a late replacement for Vitor Belfort, who was scheduled to face Mezger but was forced to withdraw. The post-fight disrespect shown by Ortiz to Mezger and the Lion's Den led to the long-running rivalry between Ortiz and Lion's Den leader Ken Shamrock.

UFC 19 was part three of what the UFC called "The Road To The Heavyweight Title", a four-part tournament of sorts, held to determine the Heavyweight Champion after the title was vacated by Randy Couture. It was determined that the winner of Kevin Randleman vs. Maurice Smith would face Bas Rutten at UFC 20 for the Undisputed UFC Heavyweight Championship Title.

Results

See also 
 Ultimate Fighting Championship
 List of UFC champions
 List of UFC events
 1999 in UFC

External links
UFC19 results at Sherdog.com
UFC Official Website
IMDB Page

Ultimate Fighting Championship events
1999 in mixed martial arts
Mixed martial arts in Mississippi
Sports in Bay St. Louis, Mississippi
1999 in sports in Mississippi